Palamari is a mountain village and a community in the municipal unit Trikolonoi, in Arcadia, Greece. It is located on a mountain slope north of the valley of the river Alfeios, at about 700 m elevation. It is 2 km west of Pavlia, 7 km east of Karytaina, 8 km southeast of Stemnitsa and 10 km north of Megalopoli. In 2011 Palamari had a population of 15 for the village, and 66 for the community, which includes the village Psari. The site of the ancient town of Thyraeum is located nearby.

Population

External links
History and information about Palamari
 Palamari on GTP Travel Pages

See also

List of settlements in Arcadia

References

Trikolones
Populated places in Arcadia, Peloponnese